Furcy is a village of Port-au-Prince, Haiti.

Furcy may also refer to:

Furcy Fondeur, Dominican militant and politician
Henri Furcy, French cabaret singer